The Insolvency Practitioners Association (IPA) is a professional body whose purpose is to inform and regulate insolvency practitioners (IPs) within the UK and Ireland. There is a similar organisation in Australia.

History
Formed in 1961 as a discussion group of accountants specialising in insolvency, it became incorporated under its current name in 1973.  It became a Recognised Professional Body under the UK Insolvency Act 1986, empowered to grant and renew insolvency licences. It is the only such body whose membership is composed solely of IPs.  Its members act as trustees in bankruptcy, nominees and supervisors of individual voluntary arrangements, liquidators, administrators and administrative receivers of companies.

Objectives
The IPA's main objectives are to encourage recruitment of IPs; to promote their training and education; to maintain and improve standards of performance and conduct, and to regulate and monitor its members' practices, and, where appropriate, discipline them.

Every individual wishing to qualify for an insolvency licence needs to satisfy the IPA that he is a fit and proper person and has passed the examination set by the Joint Insolvency Examination Board.

Membership of the IPA
The IPA has over 2,000 individual and companies registered as members. The IPA recently widened access to affiliate membership (AIPA) and introduced a new category of affiliate firm membership for those practices, businesses and organisations which are involved in insolvency related work.

Insolvency examinations
The IPA sets two annual intermediate level insolvency examinations, the Certificate of Proficiency in Insolvency (CPI) and the Certificate of Proficiency in Personal Insolvency (CPPI).

External links
 Insolvency Service website
 Insolvency Practitioners Association website
 JIEB Online; Joint Insolvency Examination Board exams - study resource & discussion forum
 IPAA (Australia)
 Insolvency Service in North of England

Insolvency law of the United Kingdom
Financial services companies of the United Kingdom
Insolvency Practitioners Association